The 1988 Boston Marathon was the 92nd running of the annual marathon race in Boston, United States, which was held on April 18. The elite men's race was won by Kenya's Ibrahim Hussein in a time of 2:08:43 hours and the women's race was won by Portugal's Rosa Mota in 2:24:30. In the wheelchair race, Mustapha Badid of France won the men's race in 1:43:19 and Candace Cable of United States won the women's race in 2:10:44.

A total of 5261 runners finished the race, 4472 men and 789 women.

Results

Men

Women

Wheelchair men

Wheelchair women

References

Results. Association of Road Racing Statisticians. Retrieved 2020-07-16.
Boston Marathon Historical Results. Boston Athletic Association. Retrieved 2020-07-16.
1988 Boston Marathon Marathon Wheelchair. Athlinks. Retrieved 2020-07-16.

External links
 Boston Athletic Association website

1988
Boston
Boston Marathon
Marathon
Boston Marathon